Vinces is a city in the Los Ríos Province, Ecuador. It is the seat of the Vinces Canton. There is also a Vinces River.

Vinces, known as "Little Paris", is characterized by its ancient buildings, constructed in wood, that belonged to the rich cacao plantation owners.

Vinces is known also as the capital of the competitions of boats to engine outboard in Ecuador.

External links 
www.vincesnautico.com
Southern Coast & Guayaquil - Regions of Ecuador - Ecuador General Information : GoEcuador.com

Populated places in Los Ríos Province